The Religious Technology Center (RTC) is an American non-profit corporation that was founded in 1982 by the Church of Scientology to control and oversee the use of all of the trademarks, symbols and texts of Scientology and Dianetics. Although RTC controls their use, those works are owned by another corporation, the Church of Spiritual Technology which is doing business as L. Ron Hubbard Library, registered in Los Angeles County, California.

While exercising authority over the use of all Dianetics and Scientology materials, RTC claims that it is not involved in the day-to-day management of the Church of Scientology; that role is assigned to a separate corporation, the Church of Scientology International (CSI).
According to the RTC website, "RTC stands apart as an external body which protects the Scientology religion and acts as the final arbiter of orthodoxy" and its stated purpose is "to protect the public from misapplication of the technology and to see that the religious technologies of Dianetics and Scientology remain in proper hands and are properly ministered."

Since 1987, David Miscavige has served as the organization's chairman of the board.

In a 1993 memorandum by the Church of Scientology International, the following information was provided to the Internal Revenue Service with regards to RTC's role and functions, its personnel and its income:

"[...] RTC [...] owns the Scientology religious marks and advanced technology. It licenses the marks to CSI for sublicense to subordinate churches and directly licenses the advanced technology to appropriate churches. Through this structure RTC assures that practice of the Scientology religion within the ecclesiastical hierarchy under CSI's authority as Mother Church remains strictly orthodox, in accordance with the Scientology Scriptures. This church has a staff of approximately 50 individuals and an annual budget of approximately $ 6.6 million, based on its annual disbursements for the most recent year for which financial statements are available. [...]"

The RTC guarantees the “purity and workability of Scientology so far into the future,” thus engaging in programs to “restore, preserve, maintain and keep uncorrupted” the church's "religious technology," according to Scientology spokesman Eric Roux.

Corporate information

RTC was incorporated on January 1, 1982, in Los Angeles, California, by Terri Gamboa, David Mayo, Norman Starkey, Phoebe Mauerer, Lyman Spurlock, Julia Watson, and David Miscavige. Six months later, on June 15, 1982, the Articles of Incorporation were restated. On April 8, 1986, they were amended in order to clarify the disposition of RTC's assets upon the dissolution of the corporation.

At present the official address of RTC is 1710 Ivar Avenue, Suite 1100, Los Angeles 90028, in the Hollywood Guaranty Building, while its main offices are on a big estate complex at 19625 Highway 79, Gilman Hot Springs 92383, California, as it was stated in a supporting document of Scientology's tax-exempt application to the IRS during the years 1992/1993.

On September 21, 1993, the following individuals held corporate positions at RTC: The Board of Trustees was composed of David Miscavige, Gregory Wilhere, and Norman F. Starkey. The members of RTC's Board of Directors were at that time Mark Rathbun, Warren McShane, and David Miscavige. RTC's President was Mark Rathbun, its Secretary Warren McShane, and its Treasurer Barbara Griffin.

As of February 5, 2001 RTC's corporate officers were Warren McShane (Chief Executive Officer/President), Laurisse Stuckenbrock (Secretary), and Barbara Griffin (Chief Financial Officer/Treasurer).

As of March 14, 2008, RTC's official agent has been the attorney Sherman D. Lenske from the law firm Lenske, Lenske & Abramson ALC, Warner Atrium, 6400 Canoga Avenue, Suite 315, Woodland Hills 91367-2491.

On August 19, 1993, RTC filed an application for tax exemption under section 501(c)(3) of the Internal Revenue Code. In the same year the Internal Revenue Service granted RTC's request for exemption.

The granting of tax exemption to RTC and other Scientology corporations was preceded by years of continuous litigation between the IRS and the various entities of Scientology. According to former high-ranking executives, the Scientology organization had launched about 200 lawsuits against the IRS until 1991. During the same time, individual parishioners of Scientology had initiated 2,300 claims against the agency, challenging the denial of tax deduction for their services at Scientology organizations. Late 1991, the dispute over Scientology's tax-exempt status began to resolve through high-level meetings between David Miscavige and the then Commissioner of the IRS, Fred Goldberg, who encouraged a final resolution of the legal battle.

Main corporate activities

The Religious Technology Center (RTC) is the owner of certain trademarks and service marks. These marks and its related intellectual property form the "Dianetics spiritual healing technology" and the "Scientology applied religious technology".

Scientology organizations, like "Churches," "Celebrity Centres" or "Missions," derive their income from the worldwide sales of this "technology" in form of courses, books, etc. to their members or to the general public. The organizations receive the right to sell the "technology" through license agreements with RTC as license holder and/or the Church of Scientology International (CSI) as a sub-licensor. RTC and CSI in return derive their corporative income through the license fees, which in turn are obtained through those agreements. The licensing and its related actions are major corporate activities of the various Scientology-organizations.

Licensing of trademarks and service marks

 Religious Technology Center (RTC) and Church of Spiritual Technology (CST)

Shortly after its inception on January 1, 1982, RTC received on May 16, 1982 "the ownership, supervision and control" of the trademarks and service marks identifying "Scientology applied religious philosophy" and "Dianetics spiritual healing technology" by the originator and founder of Scientology, L. Ron Hubbard through an "Assignment Agreement".

This agreement was subject to an additional "Option Agreement" between Hubbard, RTC and another Scientology corporation, the Church of Spiritual Technology (CST). In two "Option Agreements" from May 1982, Hubbard granted CST the right to purchase at any time from RTC the "Marks", the "Advanced Technology" and all the rights to them for the sum of $100.

Parallel and similar-sounding agreements between Hubbard, RTC and CST were created during that period concerning the "Advanced Technology," which consists of unpublished derivates of Scientology's confidential "Advanced technology" (OT Levels).

Under these agreements RTC is to turn over 90% of its net income to CST. A document from 1991, reflecting the "financial money flows" of RTC during the year 1989, showed a turnover of 59% of RTC's net income towards CST.

 Religious Technology Center (RTC) and Church of Scientology International (CSI)

RTC and CSI entered a license agreement on May 18, 1982, granting CSI, the new "Mother Church of Scientology," the right to use and sub-license certain of the trademarks and service marks. In return for the grant of the marks, the agreement gave RTC practically an unlimited corporate control not only over the activities of CSI but also over every organization that is a sub-licensee of CSI.

In particular the agreement stated:

"[...] d) RTC shall have the right to monitor all operations of CSI and its related organizations, inspect all books, records and facilities, pertaining to use of the Marks and receive sample specimens and summaries of literature, publications and products using the marks, [...] e) RTC may, if it ever deems it necessary or advisable, send a corrective mission to any organization authorized the Marks to correct any deviation from the standards, specifications or guidelines of this Agreement, [... ]"

Additionally RTC and CSI signed on January 1, 1982, an "Organizational Covenant" granting CSI the right to deliver the "Advanced Technology" to its staff members.

 Religious Technology Center (RTC) and Church of Scientology Western United States (CoSWUS)

RTC and CoSWUS entered on May 23, 1985, an organizational covenant granting CoSWUS the right to sell and deliver the "Advanced Technology" to its public members while guaranteeing weekly payments of 6% of the monetary value of the "Advanced Technology"-services that are being delivered to the public from CoSWUS towards RTC.

 Religious Technology Center (RTC) and Church of Scientology Flag Service Organization, Inc. (FSO)

On January 1, 1982, RTC and FSO signed an organizational covenant with similar content to the covenant between RTC and CoSWUS.

 Religious Technology Center (RTC) and other Scientology organizations

RTC has entered over the years similar organizational covenants/license agreements with all the other "Advanced Organizations" (AOs) within the Scientology network. As all the AO's are integrated within a corporation, these agreements are formulated between RTC and these corporations, such as "Church of Scientology Flag Ship Service Organization, Inc." from Netherlands Antilles, the "Church of Scientology Religious Education College, Inc." from East Grinstead, England, the "Church of Scientology, Inc." from Sydney, Australia and with "Church of Scientology Advanced Organization Saint Hill Europe & Africa" (AOSH EU).

RTC has registered its service marks and trademarks in various countries all over the world. Due to certain legal restrictions for religious corporations in certain countries, RTC founded the corporation "Inspector General Network, Inc." (IGN) on June 7, 1985, which functions as a "secular" representative for RTC in those countries. In 1985 RTC entered with IGN a so-called "Reversion and Reservation Agreement", which regulated the rights and obligations with regards to the Scientology and Dianetics trademarks of the "secular" organizations IGN and "World Institute of Scientology Enterprises, Inc." (WISE Inc.), a dormant Delaware corporation.

Control of other corporations

At the time of RTC's filing for tax exemption, RTC controlled four other corporations:

 "Inspector General Network" (IGN)

IGN has served as legal representative for RTC and secular registered owner of RTC's trade and service marks "in countries where contracts by religious corporations are not enforced". All corporate positions of IGN were held by members of RTC.

 "WISE, Inc."

At the time of Scientology's application for tax exemption, WISE, Inc. has been a dormant corporation from Delaware. It had the same functions as IGN, prior to IGN's incorporation in 1985.

 "RTC Australia"

RTC Australia was incorporated in 1986 as a regional office for RTC in Australia. It is a dormant corporation and has obtained tax exempt status.

 "Inspector General Network International AB" (IGN Int)

IGN was incorporated in 1992 in Sweden. The organization was founded to register Scientology's trade and service marks as a nominee for RTC in countries, such as Libya or Iran "that do not recognize and will not do business with any United States entity".

Organizational structure and management
RTC stands hierarchically at the top of the Church of Scientology network. It has regulatory, corporate and ecclesiastical power over the policy and activities of all other Scientology management units, corporations, churches, missions and other organizations - with the only exception being the Church of Spiritual Technology. The position of RTC is notably visible in a drawing titled "The Command Channels of Scientology", which the Church of Scientology International (CSI) and RTC provided to the IRS in their application for tax-exempt status. The Church of Spiritual Technology has not been included in this application.

In its application for tax exemption, RTC described the internal structure of the organization as follows:

"[...] RTC's daily activities are carried out by a staff of 54 highly-trained individuals who function in their positions within the overall ecclesiastical hierarchy of the Scientology religion. Through receipt of reports and direct inspections, RTC ensures that those utilizing the marks are ministering orthodox Scientology religious services. [...]"

"[...] The senior ecclesiastical position in RTC is held by David Miscavige, who continues to serve as Chairman of the Board RTC and also as Inspector General. There are also several Deputy Inspector Generals who assist in the performance of RTC's
religious functions. There is a Deputy Inspector General who functions as Chairman of the Board RTC's second in command and
sees to the day to day functioning of the organization. There is a Deputy Inspector General who oversees internal matters in RTC
and another who is in charge of RTC's religious programs."

"The religious mission of RTC, protecting the orthodoxy of the technologies of Dianetics and Scientology, is carried out by two ecclesiastical divisions within RTC as described below. There is now one Inspectorate division which consists of four departments. The Department of Data receives reports and collects information from other organizations and Scientologists and collates, analyzes and distributes the information to all other departments that require it.

"The Department of Trademark Registration, Maintenance and Enforcement gets the religious marks of Dianetics and Scientology legally registered and sees to it that all users of the marks are properly licensed. It also investigates and, where necessary, prosecutes legal infringements of the marks."

"The Department of Technical Policing inspects application of the Scientology Scriptures pertaining to the ministry of religious services by licensees and corrects misapplication where it is found."

"The Department of Organization Policing inspects the application of Scientology Scriptures as it pertains to governance of the ecclesiastical hierarchy and corrects misapplication where it is found."

"Authorization, Verification and Correction International ('AVC INT') is a division within RTC which is responsible for authorizing and verifying that the ecclesiastical programs, evaluations, strategies, promotional materials and issues as authored by CSI are in accordance with Scripture. [...]"

As previously mentioned, RTC is currently led by the "chairman of the board (of directors)" David Miscavige, who has held this position since 1987. Miscavige has been in leading positions within the Scientology management since the early 1980s. Prior to being in his current position, Miscavige had been a member of the Commodore's Messenger Organization and had been instrumental in the internal purge of the Guardian's Office, the former intelligence service and legal defense unit of the Scientology network. In 1982 he became the chief executive officer and later the chairman of the board of the for-profit corporation Author Services Inc. (ASI). Miscavige stayed on this position until 1987.

About the role and the position of the RTC within the structure of the Scientology network, David Miscavige declared in 1994:

"[...] Since March of 1987, I have been Chairman of the Board of Religious Technology Center [...]. RTC is not part of Church management, nor is it involved in the daily affairs of various Church of Scientology organizations or missions. RTC ensures that the trademarks of Dianetics and Scientology, and the technology they represent, are properly used around the world.

[...] 8 . RTC was formed with the specific purpose of seeing that the religion of Scientology was kept pure and true to the source materials of the religion. In fact, a major reason for its formation was to have such a Church organization that performed these functions in a capacity entirely separate from the actual management of the various Churches and Missions of Scientology. Not only is RTC not involved in the management of the international hierarchy of Scientology churches, but its very existence and performance of its true functions depends on the fact that it is not part of Church management. The authority of the Religious Technology Center stems from the ownership of the trademarks of Dianetics and Scientology.

[...] 11. Neither RTC nor I has any corporate authority over any Scientology church, including CSI. CSI is the Mother Church of the Scientology religion and has been since its inception in 1981. As such, CSI is responsible for the activities commensurate with such a role, including the ecclesiastical management of Churches, dissemination and propagation of the faith and defense of its activities, including external and legal affairs. [...]"

Such representations stand in stark contrast to declarations of high-level ex-scientologists, who have worked in the Scientology management. Former CSI security officer Andre Tabayoyon and former RTC second-in-command Jesse Prince have stated in affidavits and declarations that RTC and its chairman David Miscavige maintain de facto control of the entire Scientology network, including the Church of Scientology International.

Within that context, André Tabayoyon stated in a 1994 declaration the following about Miscavige's exertion of power as Chairman of the Board and ultimate head of the global Scientology network:

"[...] 59. I have personal knowledge that Miscavige issues oral and written orders and instructions to Scientologists irrespective of either ecclesiastical lines of authority or corporate lines of is authority or demarcation. Miscavige uses this omnipotent authority to exercise personal control over any and all Scientology organizations whenever he elects to do so. I observed that in running the various Scientology organizations, Miscavige constantly crosses all corporate and ecclesiastical command lines without regard to the fact that there are numerous Scientology related corporations of which he is neither an employee, officer nor director. He does not have to be to control any Scientology organization. He is above all Scientology organizations as the ecclesiastical head of Scientology, COB RTC and Commander of the Sea Org. In this capacity, Miscavige acts as the managing agent of each Scientology organization."

"[...] 61. I personally observed Miscavige take over this position of ultimate power over all of Scientology after Hubbard died. I observed Miscavige when he was COB RTC ordering into Golden Era Studios ("Gold"), a CSI division, and ordering into the Commodore's Messenger Organization International ("CMO Int"), another CSI division planetary dissemination organization, etc. Both of these Sea Org units are corporately part of CSI. RTC, CMO Int and Gold are all located at a large compound outside of Hemet, California. It is called Gold. As I learned, the Scientology corporate structure was only for the benefit of the outside "wog" world. It didn't have any bearing on how Scientology operated."

"62. When Hubbard was alive it was common knowledge and I also observed it personally that he was in direct control, via Miscavige and Pat Broeker, of CMO Int and Gold, and the rest of Scientology. After Hubbard died[,] Miscavige ousted Pat Broeker and Vicki Aznaran, who were then in control of Scientology. After that, it was my experience that Miscavige had complete control over Scientology just as Hubbard had when he was alive. Miscavige took over Hubbard's place as managing agent of all Scientology organizations. [...]"

Mark ("Marty") Rathbun, David Miscavige and Warren McShane, Deputy Inspector General for Legal Affairs formed for several years the above-mentioned "Board of Directors RTC". As of March 2008, all references to both Rathbun and McShane have disappeared from the RTC website, and their names or pictures have also been removed from other official Scientology websites. Though Miscavige is still listed as chairman of the board, no other board members are acknowledged.

Within the executive branch of RTC existed at least until 2001 the position of "Inspector General RTC," which had been held by Mark Rathbun. This network spanned from RTC headquarters in Gilman Hot Springs to all of the "Advanced Organizations" in Los Angeles, Clearwater, East Grinstead, Copenhagen and Sidney, where RTC has maintained offices.

In an internal newsletter, "Keeping Scientology Working," RTC stated the following about the purpose and duties of the "Inspector General Network":

"These Deputy Inspector Generals head the entire IG Network, which locates and handles internal and external infiltration and suppression, legally protects and safeguards the trademarks and technology of the religion of Scientology, and sees that management, orgs and missions and their application of tech and policy remain standard and true to LRH's writings."

While RTC has a dominant role over the "mother church," CSI and its subordinate organizations, the relationship to the Church of Spiritual Technology (CST) is unclear. While the above-mentioned "assignment agreement" with L. Ron Hubbard on May 10, 1982, granted CST corporative authority over RTC with respect to Scientology's trademarks and service marks, there is no sign that CST ever executed any internal, "ecclesiastical" authority over RTC. In fact, the U.S. Claims Court noted in its opinion in a tax case, which involved CST in 1992:

"CST claims that it does not and will not monitor RTC's use of the religious marks and technology. CST explains that there is no need to do so because any unorthodox use would be immediately obvious. Regardless of how it arrived at the conclusion, however, the point is that one of its obligations is to prevent misuse of the marks and technology. CST's present confidence in RTC has no significance. If CST ignored that element of its charter, one of the assumptions built into LRH's gift would be missing. Monitoring for a misuse by RTC is a form of ongoing oversight. The decision to exercise the option is an ecclesiastical one which would not be readily susceptible to judicial review."

Litigation

Since its inception in 1982, RTC has been involved in various lawsuits in both state and federal courts. The majority of the cases initiated by RTC contend unauthorized use of Scientology's copyrights, service marks, or trademarks. Critics of Scientology contend that a great number of these lawsuits have been launched in order "to silence critics." The courts have agreed in some cases; in RTC v. Lerma Judge Leonie Brinkema found that the RTC's lawsuit was intended to pursue the "broader motivation" of "the stifling of criticism and dissent of the religious practices of Scientology and the destruction of its opponents."

The RTC filed a lawsuit on January 1, 1985, in the United States District Court for the Central District of California against Robin Scott and the Church of New Civilization (not to be confused with the New Civilization Church), a Scientology splinter group, alleging theft and unauthorized use of confidential material owned by RTC. The case took over a decade to resolve, and was dismissed on April 11, 1996, by the United States Court of Appeals for the Ninth Circuit. In its final opinion the court summarized the history of the case and commented on the conduct of RTC while the case was litigated:

"[...] In January 1985 RTC sued Mayo and other persons connected with the Church of the New Civilization, a splinter group of the official Church of Scientology, contending that they were making unauthorized use of stolen documents relating to the religion of Scientology. RTC stated that it was "the protector" of the religion of Scientology, its philosophy and its technology "including the Advanced Technology" consisting of "confidential and proprietary information regarding counseling and training," and was the owner of various trademarks registered with the U.S. Patent and Trademark Office protecting the Advanced Technology. [...]"

"[...] After 1,825 docket entries and nine years of pretrial litigation involving three discovery magistrates, a special master, the recusal of two district court judges, the denial of five petitions for writ of mandamus, three appeals [...] and three denials of certiorari by the Supreme Court, the third district judge [...] entered Final Judgment."

"[...] [T]here is little doubt that RTC is playing "fast and loose" with the judicial system as required in the minority view of estoppel. To first assert that its unfair competition and false designation of origin claims are justiciable and at the same time assert that Mayo's identical claims are not is at best questionable; in light of RTC's documented history of vexatious behavior, RTC's actions are indefensible. [...]"

Knowledge reports
The RTC maintains a task force called the Inspector General Network, an investigatory body which operates from seven offices on four different continents. The IGN's stated function is to "keep Scientology working by ensuring the pure and ethical use of Dianetics and Scientology technology."

RTC, like the Church of Scientology, encourages the use of "Knowledge Reports" (KR) from anyone inside or outside of the Church, to report on potential misuse of the Standard Tech and copyrighted/trademarked materials. They maintain an online form in which anyone is encouraged to report any such matters that may be of concern. The use of reports is one system used by RTC to police the use of Scientology materials and the application.

See also
Author Services Inc.
Church of Spiritual Technology
Sea Org
List of Scientology organizations
Norton S. Karno, an attorney for the Church of Scientology and for L. Ron Hubbard

References

External links
Scientology sources
Official website of the Religious Technology Center
Chairman of the Board, RTC
Scientology FAQs: What is Religious Technology Center?
A Description of the Religious Technology Center (RTC)

Critical sources
 Jesse Prince articles
 Jesse Prince affidavit
 David Mayo affidavit

Magazine articles
 "Inside Scientology" by Janet Reitman, Rolling Stone Magazine, February 23, 2006
"Scientology from inside out" by Robert Vaughn Young, Quill magazine, Volume 81, Number 9, Nov/Dec 1993.

Location of Gold Base
Satellite photograph of "Gold base," Gilman Hot Springs, California

1982 establishments in California
Intellectual property law
Scientology organizations
Hemet, California
Religious organizations established in 1982
Religious corporations
Organizations based in Riverside County, California